RAMU is an album by drummer Mickey Hart.  It combines traditional drums, electronic percussion, sampled sounds, and vocals.  It was released on November 10, 2017.

The title of the album refers to the Random Access Musical Universe (RAMU).  This is a synthesizer that combines a sophisticated drum machine with Hart's extensive library of sound samples.  The RAMU is one of the many musical instruments heard on the album.

Critical reception 
In Relix, Justin Jacobs wrote, "... on his latest solo release, RAMU, Hart's created a deliciously meandering, melodic exploration, with a whole cast of more contemporary voices adding some ecstatically fun spice to the global drum experience. It’s like "Drums" and "Space" with an all-star backing band of internationals and aliens.... Thankfully, this 12-song collection is total, free-wheeling fun — all lunging rhythms, slithering jazz, bubbling beats, stacked vocals, and foggy atmospherics."

Pablo Gorondi of Associated Press said, "There's plenty of movement on Mickey Hart's 14th studio album, as the Grateful Dead drummer extends his prolific solo career centered on his amazing approaches to percussion, knowing expeditions into world music and the cross pollination between music and sciences....  the powers of RAMU stem from Hart's ability to calibrate layers upon layers of rhythms and melodies from bountiful sources — fine tuning instead of Auto-Tuning."

In a Rolling Stone interview of Hart, Andrew Leonard wrote, "Hart mixes the old – samples of blues recordings captured by Alan Lomax, snippets of never-before-heard Jerry Garcia guitar – with percussive, pulsating electronica. You'll want to put on your highest-end headphones to listen to it."

Track listing 
"Auctioneers" (Mickey Hart) – 2:41
"Wayward Son" (Hart, Robert Hunter) – 4:08
"Big Bad Wolf" (Hart, Tarriona "Tank" Ball) – 5:09
"The Lost Coast" (Hart) – 4:24
"Who Do You Think You Are?" (Hart, Hunter) – 3:54
"You Remind Me" (Hart, Hunter) – 4:08
"When the Morning Comes" (Hart, Ball) – 1:53
"Jerry" (Hart, Jerry Garcia) – 3:39
"Wine Wine Wine" (Hart) – 3:59
"Nacare" (Hart) – 4:58
"Spreading the News" (Hart, Hunter) – 3:38
"Time Beyond Reason" (Hart, Hunter, Garcia) – 4:42

Personnel 
Musicians
Mickey Hart – traps, RAMU, beam, percussionscape
Sikiru Adepoju – talking drum
Tarriona "Tank" Ball – vocals
Oteil Burbridge – bass guitar
Peter Coyote – spoken word
Jerry Garcia – guitar, synth guitar
Samuel Goodman – strings
Jason Hann – additional traps
Giovanni Hidalgo – vocals, bata, congas
Zakir Hussein – tabla, madal
Sabir Khan – sarangi
Steve Kimock – guitar, lap guitar
Niladri Kumar – sitar, zitar
Charles Lloyd – saxophone
Babatunde Olatunji – vocals
Avey Tare – vocals
Sekaa Jegog Yuskumara – gamelan
Production
Produced by Mickey Hart
Co-producer: Michal Menert
Associate producer: Reya Hart
Recording engineers: Nic Pope, Tom Flye, Adam Tenenbaum, Boris Gladkihl, John-Paul McLean, Jason Mills
Sound design: Mickey Hart, Michal Menert, Adam Tenenbaum, Boris Gladkihl
Mixing: Mickey Hart, Nic Pope, Michal Menert, Zakir Hussein
Additional recording, mixing, and production: Bassy Bob
Arrangements: Mickey Hart, Michal Menert, Zakir Hussein
Archival: "Decibel" Dave Dennison
Mastering: Chris Gehringer
Photos: Jay Blakesberg, Atiba Jefferson, Camille Lenain, Susana Millman, John Werner
Cover illustration: Stanley Mouse
Package design: Jacob Lerman

References 

Mickey Hart albums
2017 albums
Albums produced by Mickey Hart